Manduca neglecta is a moth of the  family Sphingidae. It is known from eastern Ecuador, Peru and Bolivia.

It is similar to Manduca schausi. Adults have been recorded in January, from April to May, July to August and November to December in Ecuador. In Bolivia, it has been recorded in November.

References

neglecta
Moths described in 2006
Sphingidae of South America
Moths of South America